The Steyr Type XXX (45), which was later developed into the 530, was a grand tourer-style torpedo car, developed and built by Austrian manufacturer Steyr, and designed by Ferdinand Porsche, between 1930 and 1936.

References

Steyr
Grand tourers
Cars of Austria
1930s cars
Cars introduced in 1930
Pre-war vehicles